Mian Shafi Muhammad is a Pakistani politician who had been a member of the Provincial Assembly of the Punjab from August 2018 till January 2023. 

His father Mian Mohmmad Islam remained Member of West Pakistan Assembly from 1965 to 1969, and then Member of Punjab Assembly till 1977.

Political career

Mian Shafi Muhammad son of Mian Muhammad Islam was born on May 5, 1965 at Khanpur.He served as Vice Chairman, District Council Rahim Yar Khan for two terms during 1990-93, 1997-99 and as Member Punjab Assembly during 2008-13. An agriculturist, who has returned to the Punjab Assembly for the second term in General Elections 2018. He has extensively travelled abroad. His father served as Member, Provincial Assembly of West Pakistan during 1965-69 and as Member of this Assembly during 1972-1977; and his brother, Mian Abdus Sattar served as Member, Provincial Assembly of the Punjab for three terms during 1988-90, 1990-93 and 1997-99 and also functioned as Parliamentary Secretary for Education during 1988-90, 1990-93; as Political Secretary to Chief Minister during 1997-99; and remained Member National Assembly during 2008-13.He was elected to the Provincial Assembly of the Punjab as a candidate of Pakistan Tehreek-e-Insaf from Constituency PP-258 (Rahim Yar Khan-IV) in 2018 Pakistani general election.

References

Living people
Pakistan Tehreek-e-Insaf MPAs (Punjab)
Year of birth missing (living people)